The 22nd District of the Iowa House of Representatives in the state of Iowa.

Current elected officials
Ray Stevens is the representative currently representing the district.

Past representatives
The district has previously been represented by:
 E. Kevin Kelly, 1971–1973
 Maurice R. Hennessey, 1973–1977
 Nancy Shimanek, 1977–1981
 Donald J. Knapp, 1981–1983
 Raymond A. Lageschulte, 1983–1993
 Bob Brunkhorst, 1993–2003
 Deborah Berry, 2003–2013
 Greg Forristall, 2013–2017
 Jon Jacobsen, 2017–present

References

022